Fook may refer to:

People with Fook as part of the given name
 Charles Chong, also known for his Chinese language name Chong You Fook (born 1953), Singaporean Member of Parliament
Choong Tan Fook (born 1976), male badminton player from Malaysia
Liang Wern Fook (born 1964), Singaporean writer, musician, and researcher in Chinese literature and pedagogy
Loke Siew Fook, Malaysian politician and Member of Parliament
 Wong Ah Fook

People with surname Fook
Omar Lye-Fook (born 1968), British soul singer, songwriter and musician

Other uses 
 Fook (album), 1992 album by Pigface
 Fu character (pronounced "fook", in Cantonese), the Chinese character Fú 福 meaning "good fortune" or "happiness"

See also
King Fook Holdings, holding company engaging in jewellery retailing and wholesaling operations in Hong Kong
Po Leung Kuk Mrs. Ma Kam Ming-Cheung Fook Sien College, full-time Grammar School in Tung Chung, Lantau, Hong Kong
Tung Fook Church, Christian church based in Hong Kong
Lunkwill and Fook, minor characters in The Hitchhiker's Guide to the Galaxy
Chow Tai Fook Centre (disambiguation)
Chow Tai Fook Enterprises, Hong Kong-based company
 Lukfook, a jewellery store chain of Hong Kong
Chung Fook v. White 264 U.S. 443 (1924), important U.S. Supreme Court case
Fook Lam Moon, Chinese restaurant chain with its, original branch at 35-45 Johnston Road, Wanchai, Hong Kong
Jalan Wong Ah Fook, major one-way road in Johor Bahru, Johor, Malaysia